Hartera is an annual electronica music festival held in Rijeka, Croatia. The name derives from the festivals location, an old paper factory (which was one of the largest in Europe) that functioned for 150 years before shutting down. One of the original purposes of the Hartera Festival was to preserve the old building by converting it into a public gathering for cultural purposes.

See also
List of electronic music festivals

References

External links

Music festivals established in 2005
Rave
Tourist attractions in Rijeka
Electronic music festivals in Croatia
Summer events in Croatia
Culture in Rijeka